Alexander Spiridonov (January 3, 1989, Severodvinsk) is a Russian political figure, a deputy of the 8th State Duma. 

While studying at the Saint Petersburg State Marine Technical University, Spiridonov started working at the Sevmash. In 2010, he was recognized as the best young worker at the enterprise. In 2019, Spiridonov won in The Leaders of Russia contest. He was engaged in various local social initiatives. Since September 2021, he has served as deputy of the 8th State Duma.

References

1989 births
Living people
United Russia politicians
21st-century Russian politicians
Eighth convocation members of the State Duma (Russian Federation)